UKTV Bright Ideas was a digital television channel broadcast in the United Kingdom, which was part of the UKTV family of channels. The channel broadcast a variety of programmes, often originally aired on UKTV Style, UKTV Food and UKTV Gardens, and are thus mainly cookery, DIY and gardening.

History
The channel was launched on 15 January 2003 as UK Bright Ideas, initially for the Freeview digital terrestrial television platform, but later expanded to other platforms. Along with the rest of the UKTV network, the "UK" prefix was changed to "UKTV" on 8 March 2004 and it became UKTV Bright Ideas.  It timeshared with Ftn, which has since been closed down and replaced with Virgin1 on 1 October 2007.

The channel was available on digital terrestrial television (Freeview), Sky Digital and Virgin Media.

In September 2007 UKTV announced that UKTV Bright Ideas, which only averaged 0.1% of the audience share, would be replaced on Freeview by Dave, as of 15 October.

UKTV Bright Ideas ceased broadcasting on all platforms on 14 October 2007 at 6pm. The last programme on the channel was an episode of Antiques Roadshow, followed by a promotion of Dave.

Former programming
A House in Florida - UKTV Style
Antiques Roadshow - UKTV History
Ching's Kitchen - UKTV Food
Design ER - UKTV Style
Fly to Buy - UKTV Style
Food Uncut - UKTV Food
Garden Rivals - UKTV Gardens
Great Food Live - UKTV Food
Heaven's Kitchen at Large - UKTV Food
House Chain: Under Offer - UKTV Style
House in Spain - UKTV Style
James Martin Digs Deep
My Favourite Garden - UKTV Gardens
Model Gardens - UKTV Gardens
Our House - UKTV Style
Perfect Properties - UKTV Style
Ready Steady Cook - UKTV Food
Safari Chef with Mike Robinson - UKTV Food
Summer Live - UKTV Style
The Thai Way - UKTV Food
Tuscany to Go - UKTV Food
Worrall Thompson

References

External links
The TV Room looks at presentation/branding on the UKTV channels

Defunct television channels in the United Kingdom
Television channels and stations established in 2003
Television channels and stations disestablished in 2007
UKTV
UKTV channels